The Aripuanã State Forest is a State forest in the state of Amazonas, Brazil.

Location

The Aripuanã State Forest is in the municipality of Apuí, Amazonas.
The forest is bounded by the border with the state of Mato Grosso to the south, the Aripuanã Sustainable Development Reserve to the east and the Guariba Extractive Reserve to the west.
The Paxiúba River, a tributary of the Aripuanã River enters the forest from the south and flows across it in a northerly direction.
The Paxiubinha River rises in the forest and joins the Paxiúba River on the northern boundary of the forest.

History

The Aripuanã State Forest was created by Amazonas state governor decree 24807 of 19 January 2005.
The objectives are to support multiple sustainable uses of forest resources and scientific research with emphasis of methods of sustainable exploitation of native forests.

Conservation

The Aripuanã State Forest is an integral part of the Apuí Mosaic, which totals  in area and contains the Guariba and Sucunduri State Parks; Bararati and Aripuanã sustainable development reserves; Guariba Extractive Reserve; and Sucunduri, Aripuana, Apuí and Manicoré state forests.

Notes

Sources

2005 establishments in Brazil
State forests of Brazil
Protected areas of Amazonas (Brazilian state)
Protected areas established in 2005